The 2022 Porsche Tennis Grand Prix was a women's professional tennis tournament played on indoor clay courts at the Porsche Arena in Stuttgart, Germany, from 18 to 24 April 2022. It was the 44th edition of the Porsche Tennis Grand Prix and is classified as a WTA 500 tournament on the 2022 WTA Tour.

Champions

Singles 

  Iga Świątek def.  Aryna Sabalenka, 6–2, 6–2

This is Świątek's fourth WTA singles title of the year and seventh of her career.

Doubles 

  Desirae Krawczyk /  Demi Schuurs def.  Coco Gauff /  Zhang Shuai, 6–3, 6–4

Point distribution

Prize money 

1Qualifiers prize money is also the Round of 32 prize money.
*per team

Singles main draw entrants

Seeds

1 Rankings are as of 11 April 2022.

Other entrants
The following player received a wildcard into the main draw:
  Jule Niemeier
  Laura Siegemund

The following players received entry from the qualifying draw:
  Eva Lys
  Chloé Paquet
  Storm Sanders
  Nastasja Schunk

The following player received entry as a lucky loser :
  Tamara Korpatsch

Withdrawals 
 Before the tournament
  Victoria Azarenka → replaced by  Petra Kvitová
  Danielle Collins → replaced by  Zhang Shuai
  Barbora Krejčíková → replaced by  Viktorija Golubic
  Jeļena Ostapenko → replaced by  Bianca Andreescu
  Jasmine Paolini → replaced by  Tamara Korpatsch
  Anastasia Pavlyuchenkova → replaced by  Markéta Vondroušová
  Elina Svitolina → replaced by  Camila Giorgi

 During the tournament
  Maria Sakkari (GI illness)

Doubles main draw entrants

Seeds 

1 Rankings as of 11 April 2022.

Other entrants 
The following pairs received a wildcard into the doubles main draw:
  Jule Niemeier /  Nastasja Schunk

The following pairs received entry as an alternates:
  Cristina Bucșa /  Tamara Zidanšek

Withdrawals 
 Before the tournament
  Ekaterine Gorgodze /  Sabrina Santamaria → replaced by  Andreea Mitu /  Sabrina Santamaria
  Vivian Heisen /  Monica Niculescu → replaced by  Vivian Heisen /  Panna Udvardy
  Nadiia Kichenok /  Raluca Olaru → replaced by  Nadiia Kichenok /  Anastasia Rodionova
  Jasmine Paolini /  Laura Siegemund → replaced by  Cristina Bucșa /  Tamara Zidanšek
  Ellen Perez /  Nicole Melichar-Martinez → replaced by  Jessy Rompies /  Peangtarn Plipuech

References

External links
 

Porsche Tennis Grand Prix
Porsche Tennis Grand Prix
Porsche Tennis Grand Prix
2020s in Baden-Württemberg
Porsche Tennis Grand Prix
Porsche Tennis Grand Prix